Addite Shirwaikar Malik(born 13 October 1982) is an Indian television actress and entrepreneur. She is well known for playing the role of Meeta in Shararat and Sonu in Kahaani Ghar Ghar Kii. She started her career in the early 2000s. She has done many shows like Baat Hamari Pakki Hai, Junior G, Miilee, 26/12.

Personal life 
Malik was born to a Maharashtian family in Mumbai. 
She is married to an Indian television actor and her co-star from Miilee, Mohit Malik.
Mohit proposed to Addite on 1 April 2006, the couple became engaged on 14 July 2010, and were married on 1 December 2010. In December 2020, the couple announced that they are expecting their first child in May 2021. She gave a birth to a baby boy on 27 April 2021 named Ekbir Malik.

Career 
She has started her career in early 2000s. She played the role of Sonu, in Ekta Kapoor's serial Kahaani Ghar Ghar Kii. In 2001 she worked in Junior G. In 2002 she played the role of Juhi Parmar's onscreen elder sister Mini Mishra in Kumkum – Ek Pyara Sa Bandhan. In 2003 she played the role of Meeta in Shararat for which she is well known. In 2004 she has done Asit Kumarr Modi's show Saarrthi in which she played the main atagonist Vishakha and Star Plus's Dekho Magar Pyaar Se and Koie Jane Na.

In 2006, she played the role of one of the three sisters with Kamya Panjabi in Banoo Main Teri Dulhann. In 2008 she participated in Nach Baliye 4 with Mohit Malik. In 2009 she hosted Star Vivaah with Mohnish Bahl. In 2010 she had played the role of Preeti Avi's wife in Baat Hamari Pakki Hai opposite Rohit Bharadwaj. In 2011 she played the onscreen sister of Harshad Chopda as Mohan Galla's sister in Dharampatni.

She is away from screen when her show Chabbis Barah went off air in 2013 in which she played the parallel lead. In July 2018 there are many news that she will enter in Kullfi Kumarr Bajewala which also featured her husband Mohit Malik.

In 2020 she featured in the music video Tahe Dil Se Shukriya. An initiative by Mousiki Records along with Arjun Bijlani, Srishty Rode, Simple Kaul, Heli Daruwala and others.

Entrepreneurship 
She is the owner of five restaurants four in Mumbai and one in Banglore with her friends Simple Kaul and Vatsala Rajeev Raj.
Her restaurants are:
The Homemade Cafe in Oshiwara
1BHK Brew House Kitchen in Oshiwara
The Homemade Cafe and Bar in Juhu
 1BHK Bar House Kitchen  in Koramangala
Baoji Asian Home Cafe in Oshiwara

Television

Music videos

See also 
List of Indian television actresses

References

External links
 
 

Indian film actresses
Indian women television presenters
Indian television presenters
Living people
1982 births